Fred Parker (born 23 October 1893) was an English footballer who played as a half-back for Manchester City, Nottingham Forest, and Southport. He helped Forest to win the Second Division title in 1921–22.

Career
Parker played for local non-league sides Seaham Albion and Seaham Harbour, before getting his big break with Manchester City of the Football League in 1914. He featured 18 times in 1916–17 and 1918–19. World War I greatly disrupted his career, seeing him guest for Port Vale, Stoke (playing five games in 1918–19) and Chesterfield in 1919.

Career statistics
Source:

References

1893 births
Year of death missing
Sportspeople from Seaham
Footballers from County Durham
English footballers
Association football defenders
Manchester City F.C. players
Port Vale F.C. wartime guest players
Stoke City F.C. wartime guest players
Chesterfield F.C. wartime guest players
Nottingham Forest F.C. players
Southport F.C. players
English Football League players